Saurabh Pradeep Wakaskar (born 8 September 1991) is an Indian cricketer who plays for Baroda in domestic cricket. He is a left-hand opening batsman and leg break bowler.

References

External links

1991 births
Living people
Indian cricketers
Baroda cricketers